Dragana Atlija (born 14 October 1986 in Knin, SFR Yugoslavia) is a Serbian model and actress. She was Miss Serbia 2009.

Personal life
Atlija was born in Knin, Croatia (then part of SFR Yugoslavia), and raised in Belgrade. She studied Stock Exchange at R&B College International and speaks several languages: Serbo-Croatian, English, Spanish and Italian.

Modeling and Miss Serbia
Atlija acted as model at Miss Global Beauty Queen 2008 in China. She won the title "Miss Bikini charm" at Miss Body Beautiful 2008, and in the same year won Miss Serbia 2008 and represented the country at Miss Universe 2009 in Nassau, Commonwealth of the Bahamas.

Acting
Since 2014 she has also worked as an actress. Her first role was as Tennis player in the Action-drama film 3 Days to Kill. This role was followed by a cameo stint as a Shot girl in the action-crime thriller film The November Man. Her first leading role came with the role as Lizzy in the action-thriller Everly. She next portrayed Shiba in a supporting role of Ironclad: Battle for Blood.

Filmography
 Everly (2014) as Lizzy
 The November Man (2014) as Shot girl
 Ironclad: Battle for Blood (2014) as Shiba
 3 Days to Kill (2014) as Tennis woman

References

External links 
 

1986 births
Miss Universe 2009 contestants
Serbian female models
Living people
People from Knin
Serbs of Croatia
Serbian beauty pageant winners
Models from Belgrade
Actresses from Belgrade